Psalm 6 is the sixth psalm of the Book of Psalms, beginning in English in the King James Version: "O LORD, rebuke me not in thine anger, neither chasten me in thy hot displeasure". In Latin, it is known as "Domine ne in furore tuo arguas me". This penitential psalm is traditionally attributed to David. 

The psalm forms a regular part of Jewish, Catholic, Lutheran, Anglican and other Protestant liturgies. It was paraphrased to a metred hymn in German, "Straf mich nicht in deinem Zorn" by Johann Georg Albinus, which Catherine Winkworth translated into "Not in anger, Mighty God". The psalm has been set to music by composers such as Heinrich Schütz, Johann Sebastian Bach, Max Reger, Jules Van Nuffel and Norma Wendelburg.

Text

Hebrew Bible version 
The following is the Hebrew text of Psalm 6:

King James Version 
 O LORD, rebuke me not in thine anger, neither chasten me in thy hot displeasure.
 Have mercy upon me, O LORD; for I am weak: O LORD, heal me; for my bones are vexed.
 My soul is also sore vexed: but thou, O LORD, how long?
 Return, O LORD, deliver my soul: oh save me for thy mercies' sake.
 For in death there is no remembrance of thee: in the grave who shall give thee thanks?
 I am weary with my groaning; all the night make I my bed to swim; I water my couch with my tears.
 Mine eye is consumed because of grief; it waxeth old because of all mine enemies.
 Depart from me, all ye workers of iniquity; for the LORD hath heard the voice of my weeping.
 The LORD hath heard my supplication; the LORD will receive my prayer.
 Let all mine enemies be ashamed and sore vexed: let them return and be ashamed suddenly.

Translations
Several significant translations can be identified from the early modern period. In 1532, Marguerite de Navarre, a woman of French nobility, included the sixth psalm of David in the new editions of the popular Miroir de l’âme pécheresse ("The Mirror of a Sinful Soul"). The psalm would also be later translated by the future Elizabeth I of England in 1544, when Elizabeth was eleven years old. Many  feel that the penitential Psalm had a reformation orientation to the readers of the day.

Themes
Psalm 6 is supposed to have been written to serve as a prayer for anyone suffering from sickness or distress or for the state of the Kingdom of Israel while suffering through oppression.

The Geneva Bible (1599) gives the following summary:

The psalm is the first of the seven Penitential Psalms, as identified by Cassiodorus in a commentary of the 6th century AD. Many translations have been made of these psalms, and musical settings have been made by many composers.
From Augustine's Enarrationes  until Eduard König and the advent of the form-critical method in the early 20th century, this was considered one of the penitential psalms. Since then, Hermann Gunkel has classed it as one of the Individual Lamentations, as one of the"Sick Psalms". German scholar Antonius Kuckhoff considers this psalm to be the "paradigmatic example" of the supplication form in the psalms.

For Martin Luther, the 6th Psalm was very important. It illustrated various central points of his theology.

Psalm 6 is in three parts, distinguished by the person: 
First, the psalmist addresses God and 
then he speaks for himself, and 
finally he speaks to his enemies. 
The psalmist expresses his distress in parts 1 and 2 and uses a rich palette of words to describe this distress: "powerless", "bone shaking" (verse 2), "extreme distress". He even expresses his distress by the excessiveness of "a bed wet with tears", and an "eye consumed because of grief".

In stating the enemies of the Psalmist, we understand that this distress is caused by relational problem. But it is unclear if he is innocent. However, he says he will be reinstated and that his opponents will be confounded. Trouble seems primarily psychological, but is also expressed through the body. It is as much the body as the soul of the psalmist cries out to God. In fact, it is also touched in his spiritual being, faced with the abandonment of God. In the absence of God emerges the final hope of the Psalmist, expressed confidence cry in the last three verses.

Heading
The Psalm header can be interpreted in different ways:
As an indication for the conductor
for the musical performance (stringed instruments)
eschatological in view of the end times (which lowers the potentially incorrect translation of the Septuagint close)

Uses

New Testament
Some verses of Psalm 6 are referenced in the New Testament:
 Verse 8 in Matthew 7:23; .

In the Psalms almost all lament Psalms end with an upturn and here the upturn is a statement of confidence in being heard.  .

Catholicism
According to the Rule of St. Benedict (530 AD), Psalm 1 to Psalm 20 were mainly reserved for the office of Prime. According to the Rule of St. Benedict, (530) it was used on Monday, in the Prime after Psalm 1 and Psalm 25. In the Liturgy of the Hours as well, Psalm 6 is recited or sung to the Office of Readings for Monday of the first week.

Ethiopian Orthodox Tewahedo Church
Verse 1 (which is almost identical to verse 1 of Psalm 38) is quoted in chapter 6 of 1 Meqabyan, a book considered canonical by this church.

Music
Heinrich Schütz set two different metred hymns paraphrasing Psalm 6, "Ach, Herr, straf mich nicht", SWV 24, included in his Psalmen Davids, Op. 2 (1619), and "Ach Herr mein Gott, straf mich doch nicht", SWV 102, as part of his Becker Psalter settings, Op. 5 (1628). "Herr, straf mich nicht in deinem Zorn / Das bitt ich dich von Herzen" (not to be confused with "Herr, straf mich nicht in deinem Zorn / Lass mich dein Grimm verzehren nicht", a paraphrase of Psalm 38) is a German paraphrase of Psalm 6, set by, among others, Johann Crüger (1640, Zahn No. 4606a). Settings based on Crüger's hymn tune were included in the Neu Leipziger Gesangbuch, and composed by Johann Sebastian Bach (BWV 338).

Psalm 6 also formed the basis of the metred hymn "Straf mich nicht in deinem Zorn" (Do not punish me in your anger) by Johann Georg Albinus (1686, excerpt; EKG 176), which Catherine Winkworth translated into "Not in anger, Mighty God". The French composer Henry Desmarets used the psalm "Domine ne in furore" (1713) in the work Grands Motets Lorrains.

Max Reger composed a chorale fantasia for organ, on of his two Zwei Choralphantasien, Op. 40, in 1899, as his Op. 40. Jules Van Nuffel set the psalm in Latin in 1935 as his Op. 44. Alan Hovhaness set verses 1-4 in his opus 28 O Lord, Rebuke Me Not. In 1973, Norma Wendelburg wrote a setting in English, "My Lord, Chastise Me Not in Anger", for mixed chorus and optional organ.

Psalm 6 in medieval illumination
The psalm was frequently chosen for illumination in medieval Books of Hours, to open the section containing the penitential psalms.

Notes

References

External links 

 
 
  in Hebrew and English - Mechon-mamre
 Text of Psalm 6 according to the 1928 Psalter
 For the leader; with stringed instruments, "upon the eighth." / A psalm of David. / Do not reprove me in your anger, LORD, nor punish me in your wrath. (text and footnotes) United States Conference of Catholic Bishops
 Psalm 6:1 (introduction and text) biblestudytools.com
 Psalm 6 – A Confident Answer to an Agonized Plea enduringword.com
 Psalm 6 / Refrain: Turn again, O Lord, and deliver my soul. Church of England
 Psalm 6 at biblegateway.com
 Hymns for Psalm 6 hymnary.org

006
Works attributed to David